Lagenaria guineensis is a species of flowering plant. It is a climbing vine that is found in tropical west Africa and the Congo Basin. It forms oblong, green fruits with whitish spots across the surface. The fruits are similar to those of other members of the Lagenaria genus.

References

Cucurbitoideae
Flora of Africa
Plants described in 1962